672 is a calendar year.

672 may also refer to:

Astronomy
672 Astarte,  is a minor planet orbiting the Sun
NGC 672, galaxy in the Triangulum constellation

Military
German submarine U-672, Nazi's World War II submarine
672d Aircraft Control and Warning Squadron, inactive United States Air Force unit
672d Bombardment Squadron, inactive United States Air Force unit
672d Strategic Missile Squadron, inactive United States Air Force unit
672d Technical Training Squadron, inactive United States Air Force unit

Music
The Dresden Dolls (album)#672, a song by The_Dresden_Dolls

Other uses
Area code 250#672. serves parts of British Columbia, Canada, and Alaska, USA
672 (number), a natural number

See also